Assapumpset Brook is a  long waterway in Johnston, Rhode Island.  It feeds the Woonasquatucket River and is considered part of the drainage basin variously termed the Narragansett Watershed or the Woonasquatucket River Watershed.

Variant names
Assapumsic
Ossopimsuck
Assapumsick Brook
Assapumsik Brook
Assopumsett Brook
Oesapimsuck Brook

References

Rivers of Providence County, Rhode Island
Rivers of Rhode Island